The Netherlands women's national under-16 basketball team is a national basketball team of the Netherlands, administered by Basketball Nederland. It represents the country in women's international under-16 basketball competitions.

FIBA U16 Women's European Championship participations

FIBA Under-17 Women's Basketball World Cup participations

See also
Netherlands women's national basketball team
Netherlands women's national under-19 basketball team
Netherlands men's national under-16 basketball team

References

External links
Archived records of Netherlands team participations

Basketball in the Netherlands
Basketball
Women's national under-16 basketball teams